Second-seeded Bobby Riggs defeated Elwood Cooke in the final, 2–6, 8–6, 3–6, 6–3, 6–2 to win the gentlemen's singles tennis title at the 1939 Wimbledon Championships. Don Budge was the defending champion, but was ineligible to compete after turning professional at the end of the 1938 season.

It would be the last Wimbledon tournament for seven years until 1946 due to World War II.

Seeds

  Bunny Austin (quarterfinals)
  Bobby Riggs (champion)
  Don McNeil (second round)
  Franjo Punčec (semifinals)
  Henner Henkel (semifinals)
  Elwood Cooke (final)
  Roderich Menzel (second round)
  Ignacy Tłoczyński (third round)

Draw

Finals

Top half

Section 1

Section 2

Section 3

Section 4

Bottom half

Section 5

Section 6

Section 7

Section 8

References

External links
 

Men's Singles
Wimbledon Championship by year – Men's singles